The 2020 Swiss Wheelchair Curling Championship was held from February 6 to 9, 2020 in Brig.

Teams

Round-robin results and standings

Playoffs

Semifinals
Sunday, February 9, 9:00 am

Classification for 5th place
Sunday, February 9, 1:30 pm

Bronze medal game
Sunday, February 9, 1:30 am

Final
Sunday, February 9, 1:30 am

Final standings

References

Swiss Wheelchair Curling Championship
Swiss Wheelchair
Curling, Swiss Wheelchair
Curling, Swiss Wheelchair
Curling, Swiss Wheelchair